Anja Štangar (born 6 January 1996) is a Slovenian judoka.

She is the bronze medallist of the 2017 Judo Grand Slam Baku in the -52 kg category.

References

External links
 

1996 births
Living people
Slovenian female judoka
Competitors at the 2022 Mediterranean Games
Mediterranean Games competitors for Slovenia
21st-century Slovenian women